Jimmy the Hoover were a British pop band, who had a hit single with "Tantalise (Wo Wo Ee Yeh Yeh)". It was their only hit, reaching number 18 on the UK Singles Chart in July 1983.

History
The band formed in 1982 and comprised Simon Barker (keyboards), Derek Dunbar (vocals), Karla Duplantier (drums), Flinto Chandia (bass) (later replaced by Cris Cole) and Mark Rutherford (guitar). Their manager Malcolm McLaren chose their name and gave them a support slot on a Bow Wow Wow tour. In 1983, they signed to CBS subsidiary Innervision, and the same year they had their only hit, "Tantalise (Wo Wo Ee Yeh Yeh)".

The track was produced by Steve Levine, who also produced Culture Club's multi-million selling Colour by Numbers album that same year. A promotional video for the single was directed by Derek Jarman.

A follow-up single "Kill Me Kwik", produced by Anne Dudley of Art of Noise fame, received positive reviews in the music press but failed to chart. The group were subsequently dropped by Innervision, their record label. In 1985, another single, "Bandana Street (Use It)", appeared on a new label, MCA Records, but with no further success.

Discography (singles)
"Tantalise (Wo Wo Ee Yeh Yeh)" (1983) CBS (UK No. 18, AUS No. 91)
"Kill Me Kwik" (1983) CBS
"Bandana Street (Use It)" (1985) MCA

See also
 Malcolm McLaren

References

External links
Listen to "Bandana Street (Use It)", iamnotthebeatles.com; accessed 30 August 2017.

English pop music groups
English new wave musical groups
Musical groups established in 1982
Musical groups disestablished in 1985
Innervision Records artists